

Boyle railway station serves the town of Boyle in County Roscommon, Ireland.

History
The station opened on 3 December 1862.  Shepherd describes it as "an important station" with goods facilities including that for loading grain.

See also
 List of railway stations in Ireland

References

Sources

External links
Irish Rail Boyle station website

Iarnród Éireann stations in County Roscommon
Railway stations in County Roscommon
Railway stations opened in 1862
1862 establishments in Ireland
Railway stations in the Republic of Ireland opened in the 19th century